The Ordination of Ministers Act 1571 (13 Eliz 1 c 12) was an Act of the Parliament of England. Its principal provision was to require clergy of the Church of England to subscribe to the Thirty-Nine Articles of Religion.

The whole Act, so far as it extended to Northern Ireland, was repealed by section 1 of, and Schedule 1 to, the Statute Law Revision Act 1953.

The whole Act, so far as unrepealed, was repealed by section 1 of, and Part II of the Schedule to, the Statute Law (Repeals) Act 1969.

Section 1
This section was repealed by section 1 of, and the Schedule to, the Statute Law Revision Act 1863.

Section 2
In this section, the words from "or before" to "causes ecclesiasticall" and the words "or the said commissioners" were repealed by section 1 of, and Schedule 1 to, the Statute Law Revision Act 1948.

This section was repealed by section 87 of, and Schedule 5 to, the Ecclesiastical Jurisdiction Measure 1963.

Section 3
This section, from "And that no pson nowe" to the end of the section was repealed by section 1 of, and the Schedule to, the Statute Law Revision Act 1863.

The whole of section 3, except the words "No Person shall hereafter be admitted to any Benefice with Cure, except he then be of the Age of Three-and-twenty Years at least, and a Deacon" was, and all enactments amending, confirming or continuing the same were, repealed by section 15 of, and the Schedule to, the Clerical Subscription Act 1865.

Section 4
"So much of section Five as provides that no one shall be admitted to the Order of Deacon or Ministry unless he shall first subscribe to the said articles" was, and all enactments amending, confirming or continuing the same were, repealed by section 15 of, and the Schedule to, the Clerical Subscription Act 1865. The third revised edition of the statutes has this as part of section 4 of the Ordination of Ministers Act 1571.

In section 4, the words "being under thage of foure and twenty yeres, nor" were repealed by section 1 of, and Schedule 1 to, the Statute Law Revision Act 1948.

Section 4 was repealed by section 1(2) of the Clergy (Ordination and Miscellaneous Provisions) Measure 1964 (No 6).

Section 5
This section was repealed by section 1 of, and Schedule 1 to, the Statute Law Revision Act 1948.

The text of the Act

References
Halsbury's Statutes,

Acts of the Parliament of England (1485–1603)
1571 in law
1571 in England
Acts of the Parliament of England concerning religion
1571 in Christianity